Victor (1630/1635–1697)  was a painter active during the 17th century.  He represented the late Cretan school.  He was influenced by Michael Damaskinos.  He kept his style simple and followed the lines of the improved maniera greca which was heavily influenced by the Venetian school.  One of his main influences was Michael Damaskinos.  He was active when four different artists used the name Victor.  He has a huge catalog of work attributed to him.   According to the Neo-Hellenic Institute, ninety-five of his paintings and one fresco survived.  He was an extremely popular Greek icon painter.

History
Victor was born in Heraklion.  He was a monk.  He worked and lived in Chandaka.  He was a priest at the Church of Agios Ioannis church of Mertzeroi Fraternity in Candia.  He was active from 1651 to 1697.  Not much is known about the artist aside from records and historical research dealing primarily with his signature.  He signed his artwork in different ways either ΧΕΙΡ ΒΙΚΤΟΡΟΣ, ΧΕΙΡ ΒΙΚΤΩΡΟΣ and  ΧΕΙΡ ΒΙΚΤΩ­ΡΟΣ ΙΕΡΕΩΣ.  He was extremely popular and many of his icons still exist.

Victor painted an icon for Antonio Boubouli around 1653–1654.  He was the priest at San Giorgio dei Greci in Venice.  He painted the Virgin and Child (Kardiotissa).  It is unclear if Victor traveled to Venice.  Although they did order two paintings of The Morosini Banner.  Konstantinos Tzanes, Emmanuel Tzanes and Philotheos Skoufos.  Were three Greek painters that migrated to Venice around the same period.  Towards the end of his life, Victor traveled to the Peloponnese.  The evidence is in the frescos at the  Monastery of the Philosopher at Dimitsana.  In the same church, they have a large assortment of portable icons with his signature.  He had a special relationship with Saint Catherine's Monastery or  the Sacred Monastery of the God-Trodden Mount Sinai Egypt.

There are a large number of icons attributed to this artist.  His workshop was extremely popular.  He specialized in portable icons.  His work has a large degree of sophistication.  His art does not fall in line with the traditional maniera greca which resembles  Theophanes the Greek, Manuel Panselinos, and Ioannis Pagomenos.  His work mostly resembles the Cretan school of the 16th century.  The school by this time was heavily influenced by the Venetian school.  Michael Damaskinos closely resembles some of Victor's work.  Victor's Saint Catherine bears a resemblance to Philotheos Skoufos's Saint Catherine.  Another similar painting between the two artists is The Stoning of Saint Steven.  He was active in Zakynthos towards the end of his life.

Gallery

Notable works
 The Stoning of St Stephen Byzantine Museum Athens Greece 
 The Man of Sorrows (curtain of sanctuary gate) Museum Zakynthos Greece
 The Holy Trinity  Museo Civico Correr Venice Italy
 Madre della Consolazione Agioi Theodoroi church Kerkyra Greece
Christ the Vine  Hellenic Institute, Venice, Italy
Nativity of Christ National Gallery of Victoria, Melbourne, Australia

References

Bibliography

1697 deaths
People from Heraklion
17th-century Greek painters
Cretan Renaissance painters
1630 births